The 2014 Campeonato Internacional de Tenis de Santos was a professional tennis tournament played on clay courts. It was the fourth edition of the tournament which was part of the 2014 ATP Challenger Tour. It took place in Santos, Brazil between 21 and 27 April 2014.

Singles main-draw entrants

Seeds

Other entrants
The following players received wildcards into the singles main draw:
  José Pereira
  Flávio Saretta
  Wilson Leite
  Thiago Monteiro

The following players received entry from the qualifying draw:
  Mathias Bourgue
  Alberto Brizzi
  Emilio Gómez
  Janez Semrajc

Doubles main-draw entrants

Seeds

Other entrants
The following pairs received wildcards into the doubles main draw:
  André Ghem /  Flávio Saretta
  Leonardo Couto /  Mario Santos Neto
  José Pereira /  Alexandre Tsuchiya

Champions

Singles

 Máximo González def.  Gastão Elias, 7–5, 6–3

Doubles

 Máximo González /  Andrés Molteni def.  Guillermo Duran /  Renzo Olivo, 7–5, 6–4

External links
Official Website

Campeonato Internacional de Tenis de Santos
Santos Brasil Tennis Open